East Stroudsburg Area School District is a large, rural public school district located in Monroe and Pike Counties the Poconos of northeast Pennsylvania. The District is one of the 500 public school districts of Pennsylvania. The district's headquarters are located on North Courtland Street in the Borough of East Stroudsburg. 

The district is the second largest in the county in terms of territory and is split into two parts: South and North. In Monroe County the District serves: East Stroudsburg Borough, Smithfield Township, Middle Smithfield Township, and Price Township. In Pike County the District serves: Lehman Township and Porter Township. According to 2000 federal census data, East Stroudsburg Area School District served a resident population of 37,604. By 2010, the District's population had increased to 47,919 people.

In 2009, the District residents’ per capita income was $19,235, while the median family income was $19,238. In the Commonwealth, the median family income was $49,501 and the United States median family income was $49,445, in 2010. According to District officials, in school year 2007-08, East Stroudsburg Area School District (ESASD) provided basic educational services to 8,143 pupils. It employed: 657 teachers, 453 full-time and part-time support personnel, and 36 administrators. East Stroudsburg Area School District received more than $27.4 million in state funding in school year 2007-08. In school year 2009-10, ESASD provided basic educational services to 8,017 pupils. It employed: 644 teachers, 667 full-time and part-time support personnel. The District had increased its administration to 46 administrators despite a significant decline in enrollment. East Stroudsburg Area School District received more than $30.7 million in state funding in school year 2009-10. In 2013, 209 pupils are attending charter schools.

At the time of its conception in 1891, East Stroudsburg Area School District consisted of only one high school and intermediate school. However, due to rapid growth in the area, the district split into two parts: South and North. Since 2000, they are split in terms of athletics and schools, but have the same district leaders. The South high school is located in East Stroudsburg Borough and the North high school is located in Lehman Township in Pike County.

High school students may choose to attend Monroe Career & Tech Institute for training. The Colonial Intermediate Unit IU20 provides the District with a wide variety of services like specialized education for disabled students and hearing, speech and visual disability services and professional development for staff and faculty.

Schools
The East Stroudsburg Area School District operates: six elementary schools that house students from kindergarten to fifth grade, two intermediate schools with sixth to eighth grades, and two high schools with ninth through twelfth grades.

 Bushkill Elementary School
 Resica Elementary School
 Middle Smithfield Elementary School
 Smithfield Elementary School
 J M Hill Elementary School
 East Stroudsburg Elementary School
 J T Lambert Intermediate
 Lehman Intermediate School
 East Stroudsburg High School South
 East Stroudsburg High School North

Extracurriculars

The district's high schools compete in the Eastern Pennsylvania Conference, an 18-team super league of the largest high schools from the Poconos and Lehigh Valley.

Mascot
The mascot of East Stroudsburg Area School District was originally only the cavalier, or "cav" for short. However, because of the split, North's mascot became the timberwolf or "T-WOLF". The cavalier is now just the South's mascot.

References

External links
 District web site

Pocono Mountains
School districts established in 1891
School districts in Monroe County, Pennsylvania
School districts in Pike County, Pennsylvania
1891 establishments in Pennsylvania